Annenkovo is a rural locality (a village) in Donskoy Selsoviet, Belebeyevsky District, Bashkortostan, Russia. The population was 23 as of 2010. There is 1 street.

Geography 
Annenkovo is located 15 km southeast of Belebey (the district's administrative centre) by road. Pakhar is the nearest rural locality.

References 

Rural localities in Belebeyevsky District